Jaimie D'Cruz is a British documentary film producer and director.

D'Cruz started as a music journalist, and founded the hip hop magazine TOUCH, which he edited between 1990 and 1998. In 1998, he began to make TV documentaries for the British television station Channel 4.

His first documentary film not made for TV was Exit Through the Gift Shop, directed by Banksy and co-produced by D'Cruz with Holly Cushing and James Gay-Rees.

In 2011, he co-founded alongside Francesca Newby an independent production company called "Acme Films" which specializes in producing films related to popular contemporary culture.

Filmography
Director
2009: Chickens, Hugh and Tesco Too (TV documentary)
2011: The Antics Roadshow (TV documentary)
2016: Lawful Killing (feature-length documentary)
Producer
2008: Hugh's Chicken Run (TV series documentary) (series producer)
2008: River Cottage Spring (TV series documentary) (3 episodes)
2010: Exit Through the Gift Shop (documentary)
2011: The Antics Roadshow (TV documentary)
Executive producer
2011: Life of Rhyme (TV documentary)

Awards and nominations
2011: Nominated for "Best Documentary, Features" for the documentary film Exit Through the Gift Shop (nomination shared with Banksy)
2011: Nominated for "Outstanding Debut by a British Writer, Director or Producer" for the same film at the BAFTA Awards in 2010 (nomination shared with Banksy)

Notes and references

External links

By Other Voices voices@moviecitynews.com – The Exit Through The Gift Shop Diaries by Jamie D'Cruz
Interview at DP/30 with Exit Through The Gift Shop producer Jaimie D' Cruz and editor Chris King

Living people
British documentary film producers
British documentary film directors
Year of birth missing (living people)